Hyalis is a genus of South American flowering plants in the family Asteraceae.

 Species
 Hyalis argentea D.Don ex Hook. & Arn. - Bolivia
 Hyalis lancifolia Baker - Bolivia, Argentina, Paraguay

 formerly included
see Aphyllocladus 
 Hyalis spartioides (Wedd.) Benth. & Hook.f. ex Griseb. - Aphyllocladus spartioides Wedd.

References

Wunderlichioideae
Asteraceae genera
Flora of South America